Established in 1970, grower-owned Turbana Corporation, is a leading importer of tropical produce in North America, including bananas, plantains, pineapples, and ethnic tropicals. Turbana was the first organization to bring Fair Trade Certified bananas to North America. An advocate in sustainability and social consciousness, Turbana has developed the farming communities in the banana and plantain-growing regions in Colombia over the past 44 years through its social foundation, Fundauniban. Turbana gives a portion of every purchase to Fundauniban, contributing to the $250 million the foundation has invested in social and economic projects for education, housing, infrastructure, and environmental protection since 1987. Turbana is owned by Uniban, the world's largest co-op of banana growers and the world's largest producer of plantains and Fair Trade Certified bananas, and Fyffes, number one importer of bananas and one of the largest tropical produce importers and distributors in Europe.

History
Turbana, a grower-owned banana and plantain company, is the fourth largest importer of bananas in North America, and was the first importer of fair trade-certified bananas in the continent. Turbana's parent company, Uniban, is the largest producer of fairtrade bananas in the world. Turbana offers an assortment of fresh tropical products including bananas, plantains, pineapples and 18 different ethnic tropicals. It also offers a full line of plantain chips available in six different flavors.

Fair trade practices 
As a pioneer in fair trade, Turbana was the first importer of fairtrade bananas in North America. The company's certified fruit comes from thirty Uniban-operated fairtrade-certified farms in Colombia that uphold the promise of food safety, consistent product quality, environmental sustainability, and excellent labor conditions. To date, Uniban is the largest certified grower of bananas in the world. Turbana and Uniban have utilized fair trade practices, even before certification existed, to provide financial and technical support, safe working conditions, economic development, education, fair prices and a better quality of life for their farmers. Turbana and Uniban work alongside fair trade's governing bodies to contribute a portion of each purchase to a social premium that will benefit the farm workers. This premium is invested in education, housing, microloans, health and sustainability projects in the growing regions.

History 

Source: Turbana

Product line

References

External links
 Official website

Bananas
Agriculture companies of Colombia
Food manufacturers of the United States